The provinces of Eritrea existed since pre-Axumite times and became administrative provinces from Eritrea's incorporation as a colony of Italy until the conversion of the provinces into administrative regions. Many of the provinces had their own local laws since the 13th century.

Overview
In Italian Eritrea, the Italian colonial administration had divided the colony into eight provinces (administrative regions) called Akele Guzay, Barka, Denkalia, Hamasien, Sahel, Semhar, Senhit and Serae. These administrative regions relied heavily upon the historical political boundaries in the region, including, but not exclusively, that of local nobility. These provinces of Eritrea were also used by the Federated Eritrean Government from 1952-1962 and as districts (awrajja) in Eritrea when it was annexed by Ethiopia from 1962 to 1991.

After independence, the Provisional Government of Eritrea converted the original eight provinces of Eritrea (from the Italian colonial period) to nine provinces by splitting the Barka province in two (the north known as Barka Province and the south as Gash-Setit Province), while at the same time separating Asmara from the rest of Hamasien. On April 15, 1996, the Government of Eritrea converted the then nine provinces of Eritrea into six administrative regions.

Akele Guzai 

Akeleguzay Akele Guzai Eritrea (ምድረ ቡር Madre Bur) was a province kingdom of Tigrinya civilization consisting of Akeleguzay and bordering to (ምድረ ባሕሪ Madre Bahri) ruled by King of Kings in Shewa Ethiopia. The people of Akeleguzay define themselves as midre bur and the part of themselves as due to their common heritage of ምድረ ቡር። people around these two ብሩራዉያን call them.bur Later Akeleguzay became a province in the interior of Eritrea until 1996 when the newly independent national government consolidated all provinces into six regions. The province's estimated population was 460,000 in 1990 and had an area of 8400 km2 km2, is mostly consisted of Tigrinya and Saho ethnic groups. Akele Guzai is home to more than three-fourths of the total Saho-speaking population in Eritrea. The Tigrinya people of Akele Guzai are mostly followers of the Eritrean Orthodox Tewahedo Church, Roman Catholic while the Saho are predominantly majority from Sunni Muslim. The province of Akele Guzai is now mostly part of the Northern Red Sea Region and the Southern Region.

History 
Akele Guzai is the of the most ancient regions of Eritrea. It has an inscriptional record going back to at least the 9th century BC, the earliest example of the Ge'ez script.

Akele Guzai's name has been connected to the Gaze of the Monumentum Adulitanum (which later medieval Greek notes in the margins associate with the Aksumite people). This connection has been rejected by linguists in modern times, however, due to the lack of the middle voiced pharyngeal fricative in the triliteral roots, which is usually preserved in Tigrinya.

Instead, the name may be connected with the Agazian clan conquered by the 4th-century king Ezana of Axum, and the Agʿaze (unvocalized 'GZ, referring either to a person or a group) of the Hawulti at Matara. Along with Agame in Ethiopia, it was a main center of Aksumite culture (second only to Western Tigray, where the capital was located), with a distinct sub-culture that separated the two regions from that of Western Tigray (Shire, Axum, Yeha), Central Eritrea (Serae, Hamasien, and Adulis), and frontier areas in northern Eritrea and Central Ethiopia.

In the Middle Ages, parts of southern Akele Guzai were briefly part of the larger province of Bur, Ethiopia, which also included Agame, some northeastern Afar lowlands, and the Buri Peninsula; southern Akele Guzai and Agame were part of "Upper" (La'ilay) Bur, while the lowlands were further distinguished as "Lower" (Tahtay).

Barka 
Barka was a province of Eritrea until 1996, when it was divided between the present-day Gash-Barka and Anseba regions. Its capital was Agordat. It had an area of 12,819 mi² (20630.180736000002 km).

Denkalia  
Denkalia was a province of Eritrea until 1996, when it was divided between present-day Northern Red Sea and Southern Red Sea regions of Eritrea. Its capital was Assab.

Hamasien 
Hamasien (Ge’ez: ሐማሴን; Tigrinya: ሓማሴን) is a historical province including and surrounding the Eritrean capital named Asmara. Hamassien province had a population of 623,000 people in 1984 and an area of 4,400 km2. In 1996 the province was divided and distributed amongst the modern Maekel, Debub, Northern Red Sea, Gash-Barka, and Anseba regions. 

Hamasien's population predominantly follow Oriental Orthodox Christianity and are members of the Eritrean Orthodox Tewahdo Church, with a considerable minority from the Sunni Muslim, Roman Catholic, and Lutheran communities. Hamasien was politically influential within the Eritrean highlands, in Eritrea and the whole region.

History 
The former province Hamassien was the political and economic center of Eritrea; judging from excavations in the Sembel area outside Asmara, it has been so since at least the 9th century BC. The earliest surviving appearance of the name "Hamasien" is believed to have been the region ḤMS²M, i.e. ḤMŠ, mentioned in a Sabaic inscription of the Axumite king Ezana. The region may have been mentioned as early as Puntite times by Ancient Egyptian records as 'MSW (i.e. "Amasu"), a region of Punt.

During the early medieval centuries, it was ruled by the Raesis of the Hazega and Tseazega and the Bahri negasi making their center of administration in Debarwa. According to Francisco Álvares, writing in the early 16th century, the Raesi of the Tseazegas (Habtesulus) had been able to collect tax by extending their authority almost as far as Suakin in modern Sudan.

Hamsien appears on indigenous maps of the northern Horn of Africa in the 15th century. It was governed by Zarsanāy of Adal in the sixteenth century.

Despite the Emperor of Ethiopia's grants of control of the country of the Bahri negesitat during the Zagwe and Solomonic dynasties, the 1984 "Proceedings of the Permanent Peoples' Tribunal of the International League for the Rights and Liberation of Peoples" would claom that "There was no administration that connected Hamassien and Serae to the centre of the Ethiopian Kingdom With the decline of the importance of the Midri Bahri in the 17th to 19th centuries, the province enjoyed a period of communal rule under councils of village elders, the so-called shimagile who enforced traditional laws which had prevailed uniquely in the region alongside feudal authority since ancient times. The region appeared in European maps as 'The Republic of Hamasien'. Following the death of Emperor Yohannes at the Battle of Gallabat, Hamasien was occupied by the Italians, who incorporated it into their colony of Eritrea and making one of its villages, Asmara, the capital of the colony, a status it retains today as the capital of the sovereign country of Eritrea.

Sahel 
Sahel was a former province of Eritrea until 1996, when it was absorbed into the present-day Northern Red Sea region. Its capital was Nakfa.

Semhar 
Semhar is the name of a former province of Eritrea, which has now become almost incorporated into the Northern Red Sea Region when the number and names of provinces were unilaterally changed in 1996. The province was thinly settled with Massawa as the provincial capital. The population is mainly Tigre, Afar, Saho and Tigrinya. The Tigre and Tigrinya language are mainly spoken. The population is mainly pastoralist and agro-pastroalist.

It is a common name for Eritrean females and at times males as well. Semhar is also a city in Eritrea.

Senhit 

Senhit was a former province of Eritrea until 1996, when it was absorbed into the present-day Anseba region. Its capital was Keren.

Serae 
The province is home to two of the Eritrean ethnic groups namely the Tigrinya and Tigre. It has since been incorporated primarily into the Debub Region, though some western districts have become part of the Gash-Barka region. It is believed that the name of the province is from the "dark forests" which once thrived on its fertile ground.

Today the region is home to twelve monasteries of the Eritrean Orthodox Church as well as a number of new factories in the town of Mendefera.

Districts

History 
Serae/Seraye which in old books called as Sarawi (ሰራዊ) is an ancient entity which was a region of the Kingdom of D'mt, which would evolve in the Kingdom of Aksum and later the center of the kingdom of Medri Bahri centered in Debarwa with its leaders Bahri Negasi. Serae was bound by regions of Akele Guzay in the east, Hamassien in the North, Tigray proper (Adwa/Shire/Axum) in the south and Gash-Setit in the west During this Axumite period, the region became a successful trading region as it lay between the Red Sea port of Adulis, Asmara, and Axum.

In his tablet, Ezana mentions several peoples he had subjugated and refers to himself as the ruler of Aksum, Himyar, Sheba (Saba') and Rydan in Yemen. He also mentions 'Sarawi' as one of the people he subjugated. Furthermore, he mention that he subjugated the king of 'Sarati', (this name crops up in different forms of one of which is Sarawi. It stands for the Eritrean province of 'Serae'), and says that he came to an understanding with him concerning the passage of trade caravans to 'Adulis' peacefully across his country. However, the names of these kingdoms disappeared after the fourth century A.D.  Following the fall of Aksum as a united kingdom after the Hamiti Beja tribes overran the Eritrean highlands in the 8th century A.D., the province serae formed an independent state under the administration of its ruler who was called 'Cantibai'. Some scholars wrote that the name Serae origin comes from the Sarat or Sarawat Mountains in South Arabia.

Serae appears on indigenous maps of the northern Horn of Africa in the 15th century.

Bahri Negasi existed until the 1600s. The province had its own written native administration codes that was used from the beginning of the 1400AD, which was named as the law of Adkeme-Miligae. The book existed until the come of the anti Christian jihadist Ahmad Gragn in the 1600s, burning churches and killing the believers and progressing northwards from present-day eastern Ethiopia or around Somalia, and the book was lost/burnt at that time. The people of Serae were administered without the book verbally until the arrival of the Italians in the end of the 19th century. In 1938 again the book of native law code was written of elderly and knowledgeable people from seven villages (Adi Mongonti, Mayduma, Kudo Felasi, Bet Gabriel, Qine Hayela, Adi Hyis, and May Leham) representing the whole awraja Serae except the Logo Tchiwa which had its own codes in addition to the Adkeme-Miligae. This Law had more liberal customs and low restrictions on women's rights for land ownership than any other laws in the country.

Despite the emperor of Ethiopia's allegations and grants of control of the country of the Bahri negesitat the Zagwe and Solomonic dynasties, the 1984 Proceedings of the Permanent Peoples' Tribunal of the International League for the Rights and Liberation of Peoples declares that "There was no administration that connected Serae and Hamassien to the centre of the Ethiopian Kingdom. Most of Serae and Akeleguzay are together now inside the Southern region of Eritrea.

See also
Regions of Eritrea

References

 
Subdivisions of Eritrea
Provinces